György Kiss (born 22 May 1975) was a Hungarian football defender who last played for Nantwich Town in the Northern Premier League Division One South in 2008. He now works for West Bromwich Albion in the medical team.

Club career
Kiss previously played for Dunaferr, Ferencváros and Vasas in the Nemzeti Bajnokság I, where he made 182 league appearances.

References

Living people
1975 births
Hungarian footballers
Association football defenders
Nantwich Town F.C. players
People from Nyíregyháza
Sportspeople from Szabolcs-Szatmár-Bereg County